James Edward Miller (1942 - 8 February 2019) was a Professor of cognitive linguistics at the University of Auckland, researcher on language syntax, semantics and standardology. In the period of 2003-2007 he was Professor Emeritus of Spoken Language at the Department of Theoretical and Applied Linguistics of the University of Edinburgh.

Life 
In 1965 he received an M.A. at the University of Edinburgh in Russian and French, receiving a Diploma in General Linguistics a year later. He received his Ph.D. on Tense and Aspect in Russian in 1970. After graduation, his main focus of interest for the first 20 years were in aspect, case and transitivity, as well as various models of the generative grammar framework.

In the late 1970s he investigated the syntax of Scottish English together with Keith Brown, which eventually led him to the research of a more general notion of syntax of spontaneous spoken language (English, Russian, and French), as well as the relation of spoken and written language, literacy, and the relationship of language and politics, education and identity. As a result of this research, he published a book Spontaneous Spoken Language together with Regina Weinert in 1998.

His research interest included speaking, writing and language acquisition, as well as topics on spoken language, non-standard language, and typology.

He died on 8 February 2019 at the age of 76.

Books
 Semantics and Syntax: Parallels and Connections (1985)
 Syntax: A Linguistic Introduction to Sentence Structure (1992, with E K Brown, James V Miller)
 Spontaneous Spoken Language : Syntax and Discourse (1998, with Regina Weinert)
 An Introduction to English Syntax (2000)

References

 Personal Webpage

Academics of the University of Edinburgh
Alumni of the University of Edinburgh
Linguists
Academic staff of the University of Auckland
1942 births
2019 deaths